National Highway 160H, commonly referred to as NH 160H is a national highway in India. It is a secondary route of National Highway 60.  NH-160H runs in the state of Maharashtra in India.

Route 
NH160H connects Malegaon, Chaugaon, Kusumbe, Mehargaon, Khwathi, Lamkhani, Shewade, Dondaicha, Sarangkheda, Sawalde and Shahada in the state of Maharashtra.

Junctions  
 
  Terminal near Malegaon.
  near Kusumbe
  near
  Terminal near Shahada.

See also 
 List of National Highways in India
 List of National Highways in India by state

References

External links 

 NH 160H on OpenStreetMap

National highways in India
National Highways in Maharashtra